Andrew Willis may refer to:

 Andrew Willis (rugby league)
 Andrew Willis (swimmer)